Stephen Bennett Manuck (born December 3, 1948) is an American psychologist who is Distinguished Professor in the Department of Psychology at the University of Pittsburgh.

References

External links
Faculty page

Living people
1948 births
21st-century American psychologists
People from San Francisco
University of California, Davis alumni
Vanderbilt University alumni
University of Pittsburgh faculty
University of Virginia faculty
Wake Forest University faculty
20th-century American psychologists